Androcalva rosea, commonly known as Sandy Hollow commersonia, is a small endangered shrub with pink flowers and prostrate trailing branches. It is only known from four locations in the Hunter Valley of New South Wales.

Description
The branches are thickly covered with star-shaped hairs, especially on new growth, later nearly hairless and surface becoming rounded. The leaf margins are scalloped and leaves rounded at the apex. The 5 pink calyx lobes are densely covered on the outer side with star-shaped hairs. Flowering occurs from August to February.

Taxonomy and naming
Sandy Hollow commersonia was first formally described in 2004 by Stephen Andrew Bell and Lachlan Mackenzie Copeland and given the name Commersonia rosea and the description published in Telopea from specimens collected at Sandy Hollow. In 2011 Barbara Ann Whitlock and Carolyn F. Wilkins changed the name to Androcalva rosea and published the change in Australian Systematic Botany. The specific epithet (rosea) is from the Latin rosaceus meaning "rosy".

Distribution and habitat
The species is only known from four areas all within an 8 kilometre radius of Sandy Hollow district of the upper Hunter Valley. It grows in scrubland and heath vegetation on poor sandy soils.

Conservation status
Androcalva rosea is listed as "endangered" under the Australian Government Environment Protection and Biodiversity Conservation Act 1999 under the name Commersonia rosea and the New South Wales Government Biodiversity Conservation Act 2016. The main threats to the species include land clearance, inappropriate fire regimes, browsing by goats and rabbits and prolonged drought.

References

External links

Malvales of Australia
Flora of New South Wales
Plants described in 2011
rosea
Taxa named by Lachlan Mackenzie Copeland
Plants described in 2004